Harry E. Stowers, Jr. (April 21, 1926 – July 8, 2015) was an American jurist, lawyer, and politician.

Born in Fort Bayard, New Mexico, Stowers lived in Madrid, New Mexico and graduated from Silver City High School. During World War II, Stowers served in the United States Army. Stowers then received in bachelor's degree from University of New Mexico and his law degree from the Georgetown University Law Center. Stowers then practiced law in Albuquerque, New Mexico and was the city attorney. He also worked as a New Mexico assistant attorney general. Stowers was a Democrat. Stowers served as a New Mexico district court judge. From 1982 to 1989, Stowers served on the New Mexico Supreme Court and was chief justice. Stowers then served as mayor of Los Ranchos de Albuquerque, New Mexico and practiced law. Stowers died in Albuquerque, New Mexico.

Notes

External links
Branch Law Firm-Harry E. Stowers

1926 births
2015 deaths
People from Grant County, New Mexico
People from Santa Fe County, New Mexico
University of New Mexico alumni
Georgetown University Law Center alumni
New Mexico lawyers
New Mexico Democrats
New Mexico state court judges
Justices of the New Mexico Supreme Court
Mayors of places in New Mexico
People from Albuquerque, New Mexico
People from Los Ranchos de Albuquerque, New Mexico
Military personnel from New Mexico
Chief Justices of the New Mexico Supreme Court
20th-century American judges
20th-century American lawyers
United States Army personnel of World War II